Laura Irene McGloughlin is a British translator of Spanish literature. She took a degree in Hispanic Studies at University College Cork, followed by a Masters with distinction in Literary Translation at the University of East Anglia in 2007.

Translations include Lluisa Cunillé's play The Sale (Parthian, 2008), Stone in a Landslide by Maria Barbal (Peirene, 2010), Toni Hill Gumbao's crime novel The Summer of Dead Toys, and The Island of Final Truth by Flavia Company.

McGloughlin lives in London.

References

Year of birth missing (living people)
Living people
Alumni of University College Cork
Alumni of the University of East Anglia
British translators
Spanish–English translators
British women writers